Passaic County Community College (PCCC) is a public community college in Passaic County, New Jersey, United States.

Campuses
PCCC has four campuses located throughout the county it serves. 

The main campus is located in Paterson, New Jersey, and opened in 1971. The Paterson campus is located on a stretch of Van Houten Street in downtown Paterson called College Boulevard, and occupies a footprint that extends out to Broadway near the Paterson Public Safety Complex.

Auxiliary campuses were later opened in Wanaque, New Jersey, serving the northern reaches of the county; Wayne, New Jersey, where the school’s Public Safety Complex is located; and Passaic, New Jersey, home to the school’s nursing program.

The school's athletic programs are known as the Panthers.

See also

New Jersey County Colleges

References

External links
Official website

Garden State Athletic Conference
Universities and colleges in Passaic County, New Jersey
New Jersey County Colleges
Education in Paterson, New Jersey
Educational institutions established in 1971
NJCAA athletics